is an animator, character designer, screenwriter and director for anime. His most known work is that as director and screenwriter of the various Oh My Goddess! anime adaptions.

Works

Anime
Direction
 Bubblegum Crisis
 Oh My Goddess!
 Ah! My Goddess - The Movie
 Ah! My Goddess TV
 Ah! My Goddess - Flights of Fancy
 Aa! Megami-sama! Tatakau Tsubasa
 Aa! Megami-sama! (2011)

Character Design

Please Teacher!
 Please Twins!
 Amagami SS
 Amagami SS Plus
 Love, Elections, & Chocolate
Bloom Into You

Chief Animation Direction
 Love, Elections, & Chocolate
 Fantastic Adventure Of Yohko: Leda
 Mujigen Hunter Fandora

Concept Design
Elementalors
Minor Staff in
 Macron 1 (2)
 Giant Gorg
 Macross - Do You Remember Love
 Dream Hunter Rem
 Fight! Iczer-One
 M.D. Geist
 Bubblegum Crisis
 Dirty Pair Project EDEN
 Metal Skin Panic Madox-01
 Hades Project Zeorymer
 Guardian of Darkness
 Sol Bianca
 Doomed Megalopolis
 Silent Mobius 2
 Oh My Goddess!
 JoJo`s Bizarre Adventure
 Elementalors
 Magical Girl Pretty Sammy
 Neon Genesis Evangelion
 Ah! My Goddess - The Movie
 Hanaukyou Maid Tai
 Please Teacher!
 Please Twins!
 Hanaukyo Maid Team: La Verite
 Le Portrait de Petite Cossette
 Gankutsuou -The Count of Monte Cristo-
 Ah! My Goddess TV
 Ah! My Goddess - Flights of Fancy
 Pumpkin Scissors
 Top o Nerae! (2006)
 My Bride is a Mermaid
 Evangelion: 1.0 You Are (Not) Alone
 Aa! Megami-sama! Tatakau Tsubasa
 Special A
 Ranma 1/2: Akumu! Shunmin Kou
 Evangelion: 2.0 You Can (Not) Advance
 Sasameki Koto
 Amagami SS
 Aa! Megami-sama! (2011)
 Gekijouban Sora no Otoshimono: Tokei Jikake no Angeloid
 Usagi Drop
 Love, Elections, & Chocolate

Bibliography
 The Sketch Book of Hiroaki Gohda (合田浩章スケッチブック). Style, 2022.

External links
 
 

Anime directors
Living people
1965 births
People from Sapporo